, also known as "Lonely Heart", is a 1981 Japanese mystery film directed by Kon Ichikawa, based upon the American novel Lady, Lady I Did It (1961) in Ed McBain's 87th Precinct series. The film stars Yutaka Mizutani, Toshiyuki Nagashima and Rie Nakahara in a police procedural surrounding murder at a bookstore and the private lives of the cops trying to solve the case.

Cast
 Yutaka Mizutani
 Toshiyuki Nagashima
 Mitsuko Kusabue
 Akiji Kobayashi
 Fujio Tsuneda
 Rie Nakahara
 Noboru Mitani
 Kei Tani
 Jun Hamamura
 Etsuko Ichihara

References

External links

1980s mystery films
1981 films
Films directed by Kon Ichikawa
Japanese mystery films
Films based on novels by Ed McBain
Films with screenplays by Kon Ichikawa
1980s Japanese films